The Olde Bell is a hotel and public house in Hurley, Berkshire, England, located on the bank of the River Thames. It is claimed to be the oldest hotel in the UK, and one of the oldest hotels in the world.

History
The Olde Bell was founded in 1135 as the hostelry of Hurley Priory, making it one of the oldest hotels in the world. The coaching inn expanded in the 12th century to include a tithe barn and dovecote. The hotel is said to contain a secret tunnel leading to the village priory which was used by John Lovelace, who was involved in the Glorious Revolution to overthrow King James II in the 17th century. The hotel was also used as a meeting point for Winston Churchill and Dwight D. Eisenhower during World War II. Due to its proximity to Pinewood Studios, the inn has seen a number of movie-star guests, including Mae West, Greta Garbo, Cary Grant, Errol Flynn, Elizabeth Taylor and Richard Burton.

Description
The Olde Bell buildings are Grade II* listed. The hotel has interiors designed by Ilse Crawford.

References

External links

Grade II* listed pubs in Berkshire
Buildings and structures in the Royal Borough of Windsor and Maidenhead
Grade II* listed buildings in Berkshire
Hurley, Berkshire